Guillaum Seignac (25 September 1870 – 2 October 1924) was a French academic painter.

Childhood
Guillaume was born in Rennes in 1870, and died in Paris in 1924. He started training at the Académie Julian in Paris, where he spent 1889 through 1895. He had many teachers there, including Gabriel Ferrier, William-Adolphe Bouguereau, and Tony Robert-Fleury.

Career
In addition to his training in the academic style, much of Seignac's work displayed classical themes and style, for example, his use of diaphanous drapery covering a woman's body is reminiscent of classical style, in particular the sculptor Phidias. In 1897, Guillaume Seignac regularly exhibited at the Salon and won several honors, including in 1900 honorable mention and in 1903 a Third Class medal.

List of paintings

 An Afternoon Rest
 Admiring Beauty
 Beauty at the Well
 Confidence
 Cupid And Psyche
 Cupid Disarmed
 Cupid's Folly
 Diana Hunting
 Faunesse
 Innocence
 L'Abandon
 La Libellule
 La Paresseuse
 Loves Advances
 Nude on the Beach
 Nymph
 Nymph at the Fountain
 Nymph With Cupids
 Pierrot's Embrace
 Psyche
 Reflections
 The Awakening of Psyche
 The Fragrant Iris
 The Muse
 The Wave'
 Vanity Venus And Cupid Virginity Young Woman Naked on a Settee Young Woman of Pompeii on a Terrace''

References

External links
 
 Gallery  at Museum Syndicate

Academic art
Artists from Rennes
19th-century French painters
French male painters
20th-century French painters
20th-century French male artists
Académie Julian alumni
1924 deaths
1870 births
19th-century French male artists